ROAP can mean:

 Rights Object Acquisition Protocol
 RTCWeb Offer/Answer Protocol
 Rapidly oscillating Ap star (roAp star).